Traumatic calcinosis cutis is a cutaneous condition characterized by calcification of the skin resulting from the deposition of calcium and phosphorus often resulting from occupational exposure, as in cases reported in oil-field workers and coal miners.

See also 
 Calcinosis cutis
 Skin lesion

References 

Skin conditions resulting from errors in metabolism